Beth Hamidraș Temple also Beit Hamidrash, was a Jewish synagogue that was located at 78 Calea Moșilor, in Bucharest, Romania.

History 
Founded in 1781, the synagogue was located in a building given by a Jewish woman; initially, it was named after her and her husband's name, Bet Hamidraș – Naftale and Taube Synagogue. The building was also known as  the Bet Hamidraș Vechi (English: the Old Bet Hamidraș) or the Sinagoga de la Sfântu Gheorghe (English: the Synagogue at St. George).

The synagogue was devastated by the far-right Legionaries in 1941. The building was "burnt while the believers were attending the religious service". It was burnt "when 23 faithful caught inside during the religious service were killed".

The synagogue was restored in 1947, however, today the building serves as warehouse.

See also
 List of synagogues in Romania
 List of synagogues in Bucharest

References 

Synagogues in Bucharest